Tsararano is a town and commune in Madagascar. It belongs to the district of Marovoay, which is a part of Boeny Region. The population of the commune was estimated to be approximately 11,000 in 2001 commune census.

Only primary schooling is available. The majority 69% of the population of the commune are farmers, while an additional 30% receives their livelihood from raising livestock. The most important crop is rice, while other important products are wheat, maize, cassava and barley.  Services provide employment for 1% of the population.

References and notes 

Populated places in Boeny